Yücel Oğurlu (born 1970) is a Turkish jurist, lawyer and professor of administrative law.

Early life and education 
He  graduated from the Istanbul Commerce University Faculty of Law in 1992. He completed Fiscal Law Master Programme (1995) and Public Law Doctorate Programme (1999) at Marmara University.

Career 
He started his academic career at the Atatürk University and Istanbul Commerce University.  He has been for postgraduate studies at Tilburg University in Netherlands and Ahmed Yesevi University in Kazakhstan as visiting professor. Dr. Oğurlu worked 22 years as a professor and manager in several positions and he also worked as project manager in domestic and international projects on administrative law. He is on editorial board of some prestigious academic journals.

Dr. Oğurlu is the rector of Istanbul Commerce University. He was former rector of the International University of Sarajevo.

He wrote several books, book chapters, articles on administrative law  and topics on other fields of public law. He has also many newspaper articles on law, international law and international relations.

Publications

1. Introduction to Turkish Law, (OĞURLU/GÜRPINAR), Oniki Levha Yayınları, Istanbul 2010.

2. Idare Hukukunda “E-Devlet” Dönüşümü ve Dijitalleşen Kamu Hizmeti (E-Government Transformation at Administrative Law and Digitizing in Public Services) Oniki Levha Yayınları, Istanbul 2009.

3. Idare Hukukunda Kazanılmış Haklara Saygı ve Haklı Beklentiler Sorunu (Respecting Vested Rights in Administrative Law and the Issue of Legitimate Expectations), Seçkin Yayınları, Ankara 2003.

4. Karşılaştırmalı Idare Hukukunda Ölçülülük Ilkesi, (The Principle of Proportionality in Comparative Administrative Law), Seçkin Yayınları, Ankara 2002.

5. Idari Yaptırımlar Karşısında Yargısal Korunma (Legal Protection Against Administrative Sanctions), Enlarged, Reviewed 2nd Edition, Seçkin Yayınları, Ankara 2001.

6. European Commission for the Efficiency Justice (CEPEJ), (Y. Ogurlu, C. Kucukali, Chapter) ICT in Turkish Judicial System (National Judiciary Network Project 2007, Bologna: Bologna University.

7. Information And Communication Technology For The Public Prosecutor’s Office: Country Reports, (Y. Ogurlu, C. Kucukali, Chapter) Information And Communication Technology For The Public Prosecutor’s Office: Turkey 2007, Bologna: Bologna University.

References

 

1970 births
Living people
Turkish legal writers
Istanbul University Faculty of Law alumni
Academic staff of Atatürk University
Academic staff of Istanbul Commerce University
Marmara University alumni
Tilburg University alumni
20th-century Turkish lawyers